The Best of Rainbow is the first compilation album from British hard rock group Rainbow, released in 1981.

This compilation album is slightly different from the similarly titled album from 1980, which was released only in Japan, and features mostly previously-released studio cuts, taken from the five studio albums Rainbow had released at that point. However, "Jealous Lover", the first song written by Blackmore and Turner, had been available only as a B-side in Europe (to "Can't Happen Here") and on the Jealous Lover EP in the United States.

The original vinyl-release was a 2-LP set, in a gatefold-sleeve which contained photos of the band during its various incarnations, and reached No. 14 in the UK Albums Chart in 1981. As of 2019, this compilation album has never been released in the United States.

The photograph on the cover was taken at Zaanse Schans.

Track listing

Personnel
Ritchie Blackmore – guitar, bass on track 5
Ronnie James Dio – vocals: tracks 2, 5-8, 10, 11, 14, 16
Graham Bonnet – vocals: tracks 1, 3, 9, 12
Joe Lynn Turner - vocals: tracks 4, 13, 15
Micky Lee Soule – keyboards: tracks 2, 10, 11
Tony Carey – keyboards: tracks 6, 8, 16
David Stone – keyboards: tracks 7, 14
Don Airey – keyboards: tracks 1, 3, 4, 9, 12, 13, 15
Craig Gruber – bass: tracks 2, 10, 11
Jimmy Bain – bass: tracks 6, 8, 16
Bob Daisley – bass: tracks 7, 14
Roger Glover – bass: tracks 1, 3, 4, 9, 12, 13, 15
Gary Driscoll – drums: tracks 2, 10, 11
Cozy Powell – drums: tracks 1, 3, 5-9, 12, 14, 16
Bobby Rondinelli - drums: tracks 4, 13, 15
Roger Glover - producer: tracks 1, 3, 4, 9, 12, 13, 15
Blackmore/Birch/Dio - producers: tracks 2, 10, 11
Martin Birch - producer: tracks 5-8, 14, 16

Charts

Certifications

References

External links
The Best Of Rainbow at Discogs

1981 greatest hits albums
Rainbow (rock band) compilation albums
Polydor Records compilation albums
Albums with cover art by Hipgnosis